Sophie Brown may refer to:

Sophie Brown (badminton) (born 1993), English badminton player
Sophie Willmott-Brown, a character on the BBC soap opera EastEnders
Sophie Brown (The Inbetweeners), a character from the British sitcom The Inbetweeners